Curtis Reid may refer to:

 Curtis Reid (cricketer) (1836–1886), Australian cricketer and umpire
 Curtis Reid (footballer) (1876–1912), Australian rules footballer
 Curtis Reid (rugby union) (born 1994), New Zealand rugby union player